Dr. John G. Bollinger is the Dean Emeritus, College of Engineering & Professor Emeritus of Industrial and Systems Engineering, University of Wisconsin-Madison.

Education
BS, Mechanical Engineering (1957), UW-Madison
MS, Mechanical Engineering (EE minor) (1958), Cornell University College of Engineering
PhD, Mechanical Engineering (EE minor) (1961), UW-Madison

Career
Bollinger was on the faculty of the University of Wisconsin-Madison from 1960 through 2000, and was a Fulbright fellow in Germany at the Machine Tool and Industrial Organization Institute in Aachen (1962-63) and England where he was a Visiting Professor at the Cranfield Institute of Technology (1980-81).

Bollinger served as Dean from July 1981 until September 1999.  Prior to being Dean, he was Director of the Data Acquisition and Simulation Laboratory and Chairman of the Department of Mechanical Engineering.

He was elected a member of the National Academy of Engineering in 1983 for outstanding research on machine tools, sensors, and controls for manufacturing equipment, and leadership in education and the engineering profession.

In 1992, he was named a director of Enhanced Imaging Technologies Inc. in Irvine, California.

References

Living people
Year of birth missing (living people)
Cornell University College of Engineering alumni
University of Wisconsin–Madison College of Engineering alumni
University of Wisconsin–Madison faculty
Leaders of the University of Wisconsin-Madison